Petr Koukal may refer to:

Petr Koukal (badminton) (born 1985), Czech badminton player
Petr Koukal (ice hockey) (born 1982), Czech ice hockey player